Charles Daniel Daggs (April 14, 1901 – February 12, 1976) was an American track and field athlete who competed in the 1920 Summer Olympics.

He was born in Tempe, Arizona, attended Pomona College (graduating in 1923), and died in San Diego, California.

In 1920 he finished sixth in the 400 metre hurdles event.

References

External links
 

1901 births
1976 deaths
Sportspeople from Tempe, Arizona
American male hurdlers
Olympic track and field athletes of the United States
Athletes (track and field) at the 1920 Summer Olympics
Pomona College alumni